Malaisemyia is a genus of hairy-eyed craneflies (family Pediciidae) from Assam (India), with the exception of M. ornatissima from Myanmar.

Species
Malaisemyia manipurensis Alexander, 1964
Malaisemyia ornatissima Alexander, 1950
Malaisemyia rajah Alexander, 1967
Malaisemyia ranee Alexander, 1967
Malaisemyia schmidiana Alexander, 1967

References

 

Pediciidae
Tipuloidea genera